State Route 216 (SR 216) is a  state highway located in the southwestern part of the U.S. state of Georgia. It runs southeast-to-north through portions of Baker, Early, Calhoun, and Randolph counties.

Route description
SR 216 begins at an intersection with SR 37 northwest of Newton, in central Baker County. It heads northwest, crossing into Early County, until it reaches Arlington. Almost immediately is an intersection with SR 45 (Joe Bryan Highway), which begins a concurrency with SR 216. Just after this is SR 62 (Blakely Road SW), which joins the concurrency. In downtown Arlington, the three highways enter Calhoun County and cross a Norfolk Southern Railway track. Then, SR 62 departs to the northeast on Pioneer Road. Two blocks later, SR 45 leaves the concurrency to the northeast on Morgan Road NE. SR 216 heads north to Edison, where it has a brief concurrency with SR 37 (Hartford Street). The highway heads north, curves to the northwest, and then curves back to the north, until it enters Randolph County. It continues heading north until it meets is northern terminus, an intersection with US 27/SR 1, just south of Cuthbert.

Major intersections

Arlington truck route

State Route 216 Truck (SR 216 Truck) is a  truck route of SR 216 that exists in the southwestern part of Calhoun County. Its entire length is within the city limits of Arlington. It is concurrent with SR 45 Alt., SR 45 Truck, and SR 62 Truck for about two-thirds of its length and with SR 62 for the last third.

SR 45 Alt. and the three truck routes begin at an intersection with SR 45/SR 62/SR 216 (Highland Avenue) in the central part of Arlington. They travel to the east-northeast on Cedar Street for two blocks. At Mayhaw Avenue, they turn left and travel north-northwest for one block. At an intersection with SR 62 (Pioneer Road), SR 62 Truck ends, SR 216 Truck turns left onto SR 62, and SR 45 Alt. and SR 45 Truck continue along Mayhaw Avenue. SR 62 and SR 216 Truck travel to the west-southwest for two blocks. At a second intersection with SR 45 and SR 216, SR 216 Truck ends, and SR 62 turns left onto the other mainline highways.

See also

References

External links

 
 Georgia Roads (Routes 201 - 220)

216
Transportation in Baker County, Georgia
Transportation in Early County, Georgia
Transportation in Calhoun County, Georgia
Transportation in Randolph County, Georgia